Precious Hearts Romances Presents: Paraiso is a 2012 Philippine drama television series under Precious Hearts Romances based on pocketbook novel Isla Sanctuario created by Dawn Igloria, and directed by Connie Macatuno, Nico Hernandez, and Rechie A. Del Carmen. The series stars Jessy Mendiola, Matteo Guidicelli, Jewel Mische, Matt Evans, and Denise Laurel. The series premiered on ABS-CBN's Kapamilya Gold afternoon block and worldwide on The Filipino Channel from November 5, 2012 to April 5, 2013, replacing Precious Hearts Romances Presents: Pintada and was replaced by Dugong Buhay.

Production 
The TV Series began production in April 2012, trailers were shown on July 1, 2012 on its ABS-CBN account of its second quarter of new TV Drama Programs. The TV Series was named Isla (Island), and on October 18, 2012 the title confirmed to a new name Paraiso (Paradise). The series marks the first team up of Matteo Guidicelli and Jessy Mendiola, it is also Jewel Mische's first teleserye lead role in ABS-CBN. Denise Laurel, who previously starred on its predecessor Pintada, also joined the cast in the middle of the series as the main antagonist.

Plot 
Paraiso tells the story of two strangers, Brennan and Yanie, who get stranded on an island after their ship gets wrecked. Romance blooms between them as they spend time alone on the island, but the two strangers are not without their respective baggage from the "real world". Brennan is married to his dedicated wife Megan, while Yanie's childhood best friend Justin has untold feelings for the young woman. The romance that grows between Yanie and Brennan will set off a series of twists and conflicts after the two gets back to their own lives in Manila.

Cast and characters

Main cast
 Jessy Mendiola as Maryann "Yanie" Alipio-Galang
 Matteo Guidicelli as Brennan Galang
 Jewel Mische as Meagan Villareal-Gonzales
 Matt Evans as Justin Abar
 Denise Laurel as Cassandra Romano

Recurring cast
 Juan Rodrigo as Rodolfo Galang
 Evangeline Pascual as Edith Zarate
 Bodjie Pascua as Lito Alipio
 Angel Jacob as Emma Villareal
 Ina Feleo as Amanda Galang
 Arron Villaflor as Sonny Alipio
 Dionne Monsanto as Julianna Galang
 Guji Lorenzana as Eric Gonzales
 Pamu Pamorada as Myla Lumbao
 Justin Cuyugan as Steve Uy
 Alex Castro as Albert Ramirez
 Kathleen Hermosa as Beth
 Maliksi Morales as Jojo
 Idda Yaneza as Seling
 Hiyasmin Neri as Abby
 Gary Lim as Norman 
 Shey Bustamante as Nicole
 Wendy Tabusalla as Alice
 Jessica Connelly as Josette 
 Paco Evangelista as George
 Kazel Kinouchi as Rhoda
 Macky Billiones as Thirdy

Special participation
 Ces Quesada as Apolonia "Poleng" Alipio
 Marissa Sanchez as Cristina Cosme
 Manuel Chua as Gary Versoza
 Jason Abalos as Daniel (final episode)

See also 
 List of programs broadcast by ABS-CBN
 List of ABS-CBN drama series
 Villa Quintana
 Precious Hearts Romances Presents

References

External links

ABS-CBN drama series
Television shows based on books
2012 Philippine television series debuts
2013 Philippine television series endings
Philippine romance television series
Filipino-language television shows
Television shows set in the Philippines